Sir Walter Armstrong (7 February 1850 Hawick, Roxburghshire – 8 August 1918 London) was a British art historian and author.

Early life
Armstrong was born on 7 February 1850.  He was educated at Harrow and Exeter College, Oxford.

Career
For 10 years after 1880 he was art critic to several newspapers, such as the Pall Mall Gazette, the Manchester Guardian, and the old Manchester Examiner. He made his mark in the art world, and was consulted by students and collectors, becoming an authority especially on Dutch 17th-century and English 18th-century painting. Several fine collections, of which that of Mr. S. Joseph, was one, were mainly formed under his advice.

In 1892, he succeeded the late Henry Doyle as Director of the National Gallery of Ireland in Dublin, which his predecessor had reorganized and developed; and in this post Armstrong remained for over 20 years, his services recognized by a knighthood in 1899. During his time in Dublin he wrote many books, among which his stately volumes on Sir Joshua Reynolds, Gainsborough, and Raeburn were the chief, that held a position of authority for many years afterwards. Earlier and later he wrote columns on men so various as Peter De Wint, Velasquez, and Sir Thomas Lawrence, and a book of "Notes" on the National Gallery, containing many suggestive criticisms. Armstrong was said to be quick at absorbing the essential points of contemporary researchers and in judging them by the aid of a keen eye and a clear brain.

Personal life and death
In 1873 he married Emily Rose Ferard of Ascot Place, of which there was issue.  He died in Westminster on 12 August 1918. and is buried in a family vault on the Lebanon Circle at Highgate Cemetery (West). Also interred in the family vault is the Armstrong's daughter Mary Beatrice who married Rowland Ponsonby Blennerhassett in 1876.

Selected publications

References

External links
 
 Web page on Walter Armstrong at the National Gallery of Ireland
 
 

1850 births
1918 deaths
Burials at Highgate Cemetery
People educated at Harrow School
Alumni of Exeter College, Oxford
British art critics
British historians
Museum people from Dublin (city)